"Somebody from Somewhere" is a 1931 song composed by George Gershwin, with lyrics by Ira Gershwin.

It was written for the film Delicious (1931), where it was introduced by Janet Gaynor and a whiskey bottle.

Notable recordings 
Ella Fitzgerald - Ella Fitzgerald Sings the George and Ira Gershwin Songbook (1959) (first recording)

References 

Songs with music by George Gershwin
Songs with lyrics by Ira Gershwin
1931 songs